Aripine is a populated place situated in Navajo County, Arizona, United States.

History
Originally named Joppa, it was begun as a Mormon settlement in 1883.  The Joppa name was discontinued in 1913, and the location was re-established as Aripine in 1922.  The name is derived as a combination of the first three letters of Arizona, and the flora of local forests.

Aripine's population was 60 in 1940.

References

Populated places in Navajo County, Arizona